Ganxian District is a district in the municipal region of Ganzhou, Jiangxi Province.

Administration
The district executive, legislature and judiciary are at Meilin Town, just upriver from the prefectural seat, together with the CPC and PSB branches. These organs oversee 19 towns & townships.

In the present, Ganxian District has 10 towns and 9 townships.
10 towns

9 townships

People
The population was 546,964 at the 2010 census. At the end of 2014 there were 641,677 inhabitants in Ganxian, among them there were 336,054 male inhabitants and 305,623 female inhabitants. The farming population was 540,131. There were 170,729 households. 99.5% of the inhabitants of Ganxian are Hakka.

Transport
 Ganzhou–Longyan Railway

References

Ganzhou
County-level divisions of Jiangxi